Inka is a Polish roasted grain drink. Developed in the late 1960s Inka has been produced in Skawina since 1971, a centre of coffee production since the early 20th century. Currently it is manufactured by GRANA Sp. Z O.O. While it was used in part as a coffee substitute to alleviate coffee shortages in the 1970s, Inka remains popular, in part because it is caffeine-free. It is exported to Canada and the United States as Naturalis Inka in packaging reminiscent of that used in Poland in the early 1990s.

Inka is a roasted mixture of rye, barley, chicory, and sugar beet. Cereals make up 72% of the content and in the classic version there are no artificial ingredients or other additives. Additional varieties include supplements or flavouring.

Inka is sold in the following varieties:
 Inka Classic
 Inka Pro-Health – fortified with additional magnesium.
 Inka Flavoured  – three varieties: with Chocolate, Milk (contains sugar), or Caramel
 Inka Fibre
 Inka Gluten Free

See also
 Barleycup
 Caro
 List of barley-based drinks
 Postum

References

External links

Coffee substitutes
Barley-based drinks
Polish drinks
Polish brands
Products introduced in 1971